Yanasinqa (Quechua yana black, sinqa nose, "black nose", Hispanicized spelling Yanashinga, Yanasinga) or Yanashinqa (in the local Quechua variant) is a mountain in the Andes of Peru, about  high. It is situated in the Junín Region, Yauli Province, Morococha District. Yanasinqa lies north of a lake named Waqraqucha and northeast of the peak of Antikuna and the Antikuna mountain pass.

The Yanasinqa glacier is one of those which have been observed regularly during a period of 24 years (1944-1968).

References

Mountains of Peru
Mountains of Junín Region
Glaciers of Peru
Landforms of Junín Region